Hits is a 2014 American comedy-drama written and directed by David Cross. The film is the directorial debut of Cross. The film had its world premiere at 2014 Sundance Film Festival on January 21, 2014. The film later screened at 2014 Sundance London Film Festival on April 26, 2014. On February 13, 2015, Hits became the first feature-length film to be released on BitTorrent with a pay-what-you-want model. The Recording Academy's Chapter President Tammy Susan Hurt contributed music to the film via Georgia Music Partners.

Plot
Municipal worker Dave's life changes completely when videos of his rants about potholes at City Hall go viral on YouTube.

Cast
James Adomian as Donovan
Amy Carlson as Christina Casserta
Wyatt Cenac as Babatunde
Michael Cera as Bennie
Jake Cherry as Cory
Meredith Hagner as Katelyn
Amy Sedaris as Crystal
Erinn Hayes as Maddy
Mela Hudson as Juli's Friend
David Koechner as Rich
Jason Ritter as Julian
Russ Tamblyn as Russ
Matt Walsh as Dave
Derek Waters as Larson

Reception
Hits received mixed reviews from critics. On review aggregator website Rotten Tomatoes, the film holds an approval rating of 35% based on 23 reviews, and an average rating of 5.35/10. The site's critics consensus reads: "Hits undermines its undeniably timely message with a darkly bitter tone that makes the movie's caustic humor harder to swallow." On Metacritic, the film has a weighted average score of 45 out of 100, based on 9 critics, indicating "mixed or average reviews".

Alee Karim of Under the Radar called it "a terrific film whose (apparently) controversial conclusion is earned." Justin Chang of Variety, said in his review that "David Cross’s scattershot “Hits” resembles early Alexander Payne in its playful (or hateful?) skewering of local yokels and their purportedly dim dreams." David Rooney in his review for The Hollywood Reporter said that "Celebrity in the age of the viral sensation gets broad treatment in this modest effort, unlikely to reflect its title," while Katherine Kilkenny of IndieWire opined that "the film’s holier-than-thou approach produces laughs in the initial scenes but edges closer to bland misanthropy once Liberty’s developed characters get their unjust deserts."

References

External links
 
 

2014 films
2014 comedy-drama films
American comedy-drama films
American independent films
American satirical films
Films set in New York (state)
2014 directorial debut films
2014 independent films
2010s satirical films
2010s English-language films
2010s American films